The sport of pitch and putt, a form of golf, is organised at national level in many countries. National associations may be affiliated to the International Pitch and Putt Association or the Federation of International Pitch and Putt Associations, and in Europe, the European Pitch and Putt Association.

Andorra
Pitch and putt in Andorra is managed by the Associació Andorrana de Pitch and Putt, and is played on two courses -"El Torrent" and "Vall d'Ordino". Andorra was the runner-up in the 2006 Pitch and putt World Cup. In the European Championships they have reached the 5th place twice (2007 and 2010)

see also Andorra men's national pitch and putt team

Australia
Pitch and putt in Australia is managed by the Australian Pitch and Putt Association (APPA), one of the founders of the Federation of International Pitch and Putt Associations (FIPPA). Australia has played two World Cups with a 13th place in 2006 and the 8th place in 2008

see also Australia men's national pitch and putt team

Belgium
Belgium participated for the first time in the World Cup in the third edition, played in Papendal.

see also Belgium men's national pitch and putt team

Catalonia
Pitch and putt in Catalonia, Spain, is managed by the Catalan Federation of Pitch and putt (FCPP) and has been played since the eighties when Martin Withelaw build a course in Solius (Santa Cristina d'Aro). In 2007 the number of federated players was more than 14,000.

In 1999 the "Associació Catalana de Pitch and putt" was one of the founders of the European Pitch and Putt Association, the governing body that develops the pitch and putt in Europe and stages a European Team Championship, where Catalonia has won in 2010.

In 2006 the "Federació Catalana de Pitch and putt" participated in the creation of the Federation of International Pitch and Putt Associations (FIPPA), that stages a biennial World Cup Team Championship. Catalonia has won 2 World Cups (2004 and 2006) and one European Championship (2010).

see also Catalonia men's national pitch and putt team

Chile
Pitch and putt in Chile is managed by the Federación Chilena de Pitch and Putt (FCPP).

"Federación Chilena de Pitch and Putt" is one of the founders of the Federation of International Pitch and Putt Associations (FIPPA). Chile has played twice in the Pitch and Putt World Cup, in 2006, with an 8th place and in 2008 with a 5th place.

see also Chile men's national pitch and putt team

Denmark
Pitch and Putt in Denmark is managed by the  Dansk Pitch and Putt Union (DPPU).In 2006 the "Danish Pitch & Putt Union " participated in the creation of the Federation of International Pitch and Putt Associations (FIPPA)

"Dansk Pitch and Putt Union" was one of the founders of International Pitch and Putt Association  IPPA, after vacating their associated membership of FIPPA and EPPA.

Denmark has played once the Pitch and Putt World Cup, in 2006, with a 12th place.The first Pitch & Putt Danish Open was held at Nivå Pitch&Putt Club 2009.

see also Denmark men's national pitch and putt team

France
Pitch and putt in France is managed by the Association Française de Pitch & Putt (AFPP).

In 1999 the "Association Française de Pitch & Putt" was one of the founders of the European Pitch and Putt Association, the governing body that develops the pitch and putt in Europe and stages a biennial European Team Championship, where France reached the third place in 2003.

In 2006 the "Association Française de Pitch & Putt" participated in the creation of the Federation of International Pitch and Putt Associations (FIPPA), that stages a biennial World Cup Team Championship. France obtained the third place in 2004.

In 2009 vacated their membership of FIPPA and EPPA and joined another international association, IPPA.

see also France men's national pitch and putt team

Germany
Pitch and Putt in Germany is managed by Deutscher Pitch & Putt Verband e.V. (DPPV).

"Deutscher Pitch & Putt Verband e.V." is associated member of the European Pitch and Putt Association, and associated member of the Federation of International Pitch and Putt Associations (FIPPA). They reached the 13th place in the 2008 World Cup ant the 8th place in the 2010 European Championship .

see also Germany men's national pitch and putt team

Ireland

Pitch and putt in Ireland is managed by the Pitch and Putt Union of Ireland (PPUI).

The Pitch and Putt Union of Ireland was, in 1999m one of the founder members of the European Pitch and Putt Association, the governing body that develops the pitch and putt in Europe and stages a biennial European Team Championship. Ireland has won 5 European Championships (1999, 2001, 2003, 2005 and 2007). In 2008 Ireland won the World Cup.

Also in 2006 the Pitch and Putt Union of Ireland created the Federation of International Pitch and Putt Associations (FIPPA), that stages a biennial World Cup Team Championship.

India

Pitch and putt in India is governed by Indian Pitch and Putt Union (IPPU).

The Indian Pitch and Putt Union is member of IPPA (International Pitch and Putt Association)and apex body in India for the development of Pitch and Putt Sport. Constituted on 30 March 2011 in New Delhi, India as Non Profit organization. 

Efforts of IPPU to promote Golf in India are also appreciated by World Golf Foundation (WGF). Mr. Steve Mona, CEO of WGF given his support and encourage program of IPPU to develop Pitch and Putt Golf in India. World Golf Foundation is the largest platform of the Golf in the World. Board Members of WGF includes R&A, USGA, PGA, LGPA and few other prominent Golf organizations of the world.

Italy
Pitch and putt in Italy is managed by the Federazione Italiana de Pitch and Putt (FIPP).

In 1999 the "Federazione Italiana de Pitch and Putt" was one of the founders of the European Pitch and Putt Association, the governing body that develops the pitch and putt in Europe and stages a biennial European Team Championship, where Italy reached the third place in 1999 and 2001.

In 2006 the "Federazione Italiana de Pitch and Putt" participated in the creation of the Federation of International Pitch and Putt Associations (FIPPA), that stages a biennial World Cup Team Championship.

In 2009 vacated their membership of FIPPA and EPPA and joined another international association, IPPA.

see also Italy men's national pitch and putt team

Netherlands
Pitch and putt in the Netherlands is managed by the Netherlands Federation of Pitch and putt (PPBN) "Pitch en Putt Bond Nederland".

In 1999 the first federation NPPB "Nederlandse Pitch and Putt Bond" was one of the founders of the European Pitch and Putt Association, the governing body that develops the pitch and putt in Europe and stages a biennial European Team Championship, where the Netherlands reached the second place in 2005 and the 3rd in 2010.

In 2006 the "Nederlandse Pitch and Putt Bond" participated in the creation of the Federation of International Pitch and Putt Associations (FIPPA), that stages a biennial World Cup Team Championship. The Netherlands obtained the second place in 2004 and in 2008. 

see also Netherlands men's national pitch and putt team

Norway
Pitch and putt in Norway is managed by the Norges Pitch & Putt Forbund (NPPF).

"Norges Pitch & Putt Forbund" is member of the European Pitch and Putt Association, and one of the founders of the Federation of International Pitch and Putt Associations (FIPPA) in 2006.

Norway reached the 4th place in the 2004 Pitch and putt World Cup and the 6th place twice in the European Championships (2007 and 2010).

see also Norway men's national pitch and putt team

Portugal
Pitch and putt in Portugal is managed by the Portuguese Golf Federation (FPG
).
Portuguese Golf Federation is one of the founders of the IPPA

San Marino
Pitch and putt in San Marino is managed by the Federazione Sanmarinese Pitch and Putt (FSPP).

"Federazione Sanmarinese Pitch and Putt" is member of IPPA, after vacating their membership of FIPPA and EPPA.

San Marino reached the 6th place in the European Pitch and putt Championship in 2005 and the 8th place in the Pitch and Putt World Cup in 2004.

see also San Marino men's national pitch and putt team

Spain
Pitch and putt in Spain is mainly played in Catalonia (more than 14000 players in 2007), where it is managed by the Catalan Federation of Pitch and putt (FCPP) and has been played since the eighties when Martin Withelaw build a course in Solius (Santa Cristina d'Aro, Girona). Catalonia, being the most important Spanish region where pitch and putt is played, is also the seat of the ASEPP, the Spanish National Association for Pitch and Putt. Other regions where it is played, though not so widely, are Valencia, Andalusia and Galicia, each with their own regional federations (AVPP, APPA, ASGAPP respectively), as well as the Canary Islands, Basque Country and Madrid, where pitch and putt is integrated into the golf regional associations.

Switzerland
Pitch and putt in Switzerland is managed since 2016 by the Swiss Pitch and Putt Federation (SPPF).

"Swiss Pitch and Putt Federation" is member of the European Pitch and Putt Association and Federation of International Pitch and Putt Associations

(The former Association SPPA was closed in 2015 which was one of the founders of the Federation of International Pitch and Putt Associations (FIPPA) in 2006.)

Switzerland reached the 7th place in the 2004 World Cup and the 7th place in the 2010 European Championship.

see also Switzerland men's national pitch and putt team

United Kingdom
Pitch and putt in the UK is managed by the British Pitch and Putt Association (BPPA).

"British Pitch and Putt Association" was in 1999 one of the founders of the European Pitch and Putt Association, the governing body that develops the pitch and putt in Europe and stages a biennial European Team Championship, where Great Britain reached the second place in 1999.

In 2006 the "British Pitch and Putt Association" participated in the creation of the Federation of International Pitch and Putt Associations (FIPPA), that stages a biennial World Cup Team Championship. Their best performance in the World Cup was in 2008 with a 4th place. In their six participations in the European Championships have reached a 2nd place in 1999 and a 3rd place in 2007.

see also Great Britain men's national pitch and putt team

References

Pitch and putt